The Gambia Telecommunications Company Ltd., also known by Gamtel for short, is the principal telecommunications company of the Gambia.  It is a state company, charged with the task of overseeing the provision of telecommunications and internet service in the country. In association with Gamtel's internet company, Gamnet, it has successfully built Gambia's internet infrastructure. The company was established in 1984 by an act of parliament as the single licensed telecommunications services provider in the country, with its stock 99% owned by the government of the Gambia, and the remaining 1% owned by the Gambia Port Authority. In 1993 it commenced the task of creating the Gambia Radio & Television Service, a company that operates the nation's radio and television industry. Gamtel currently employs over 1,000 people and its main offices are at Gamtel House in Banjul.

In 2007 Gamtel was partially privatised with 50% of its equity sold to Spectrum Group, a telecommunications company of Lebanon, due to financial problems at Gamtel. The merger came to an end after only one year, when Gamtel declined to renew the Spectrum management contract.  It is not clear if Spectrum still owns a significant part of Gamtel.

References

External links
Gambia Telecommunications Company (Gamtel) (official page)
Gamcel Mobile phone company
Department Of State For Communications, Information & Information Technology DOSCIT
AllAfrica, The Banjul Daily Observer, article 'Gambia: New Interim Board for Gamtel' dated 2 Dec 2008, retrieved 24 Jan 2009
Cipaco, article 'The Gambia : Gamtel paves the way to cyberspace ' 31 Aug 2006, retrieved Jan 24 2009

Telecommunications companies of the Gambia
Government-owned companies of the Gambia
Banjul